Gavork-e Nalin Rural District is in Vazineh District of Sardasht County, West Azerbaijan province, Iran. At the National Census of 2006, its population was 10,682 in 1,682 households. There were 10,065 inhabitants in 2,017 households at the following census of 2011. At the most recent census of 2016, the population of the rural district was 9,958 in 2,490 households. The largest of its 51 villages was Savan-e Jadid, with 1,002 people.

References 

Sardasht County

Rural Districts of West Azerbaijan Province

Populated places in West Azerbaijan Province

Populated places in Sardasht County